Johan Irgens-Hansen (1854–1895) was a Norwegian literary critic, theatre critic and theatre director. He wrote theatre criticism for the newspapers Norske Intelligenssedler and Dagbladet. He was theatre director of the Bergen theatre Den Nationale Scene from 1890 to 1895.

References

Further reading

1854 births
1895 deaths
Writers from Bergen
Norwegian literary critics
Norwegian theatre critics
Norwegian theatre directors
19th-century Norwegian journalists
Male journalists
19th-century Norwegian writers
19th-century Norwegian male writers
Theatre people from Bergen